Shirley Driscoll (born 25 October 1935) is an English former cricketer who played as a right-handed batter. She appeared in seven Test matches for England between 1957 and 1963. She played domestic cricket for Surrey.

References

External links
 
 

1935 births
Living people
People from Surrey
England women Test cricketers
Surrey women cricketers